† Erepta nevilli was a species of air-breathing land snail, a terrestrial pulmonate gastropod mollusk in the family Helicarionidae. This species was endemic to Mauritius.

References

Helicarionidae
Extinct gastropods
Extinct animals of Africa
Taxonomy articles created by Polbot
Endemic fauna of Mauritius